The TT1650 is a direct-drive turntable manufactured by Numark.

Features 
 Direct Drive motor with 1 kg of torque
 Battle and club style design (dual start/stop buttons)
 Removable target light
 Lightweight aluminum platter
 Detachable power and audio connections
 33rpm or 45rpm
 Pitch Control +/- 10%

External links 
 Product information on Numarks Website

Turntables